Historically, the main applications of solar energy technologies in Canada have been non-electric active solar system applications for space heating, water heating and drying crops and lumber. In 2001, there were more than 12,000 residential solar water heating systems and 300 commercial/ industrial solar hot water systems in use. These systems presently comprise a small fraction of Canada's energy use, but some government studies suggest they could make up as much as five percent of the country's energy needs by the year 2025.

Photovoltaic (PV) cells are increasingly used as standalone units, mostly as off-grid distributed electricity generation to power remote homes, telecommunications equipment, oil and pipeline monitoring stations and navigational devices. The Canadian PV market has grown quickly and Canadian companies make solar modules, controls, specialized water pumps, high-efficiency refrigerators and solar lighting systems.
Grid-connected solar PV systems have grown significantly in recent years and reached over 1.8 GW of cumulative installed capacity by the end of 2014.

Solar potential
Canada has plentiful solar energy resources thanks to its large area. Regions of high solar potential based on global horizontal irradiation being located in the British Columbia Interior, southern Alberta, southern Saskatchewan, southern Manitoba, Ontario, southern Quebec, New Brunswick, southern Nova Scotia, and western Prince Edward Island. The regions of highest solar potential are located in southern extremes of Alberta, Saskatchewan, and Ontario.

However, the country has a relatively low level of solar irradiance due to its high latitude. This, combined with cloud cover, results in a low 6% capacity factor, compared to a 15% capacity factor in the United States.
The northern territories have a smaller solar potential, and less direct sunlight, because of their even higher latitude. The National Energy Board predicts that solar electricity will grow to be 1.2% of the country's total energy production by 2040.

By region

Ontario

With the introduction of a Feed-in tariff (FIT) in 2009, Ontario became a global leader for solar energy projects. The program was the first of its kind in North America. 
Thanks to the FIT program, Ontario was the home of what was temporarily the largest solar farm in the world (in October 2010) until surpassed by larger farms in China and India.  Located in Sarnia, Ontario, the 97 megawatt Sarnia Photovoltaic Power Plant can power more than 12,000 homes.
Ontario has several other large PV power plants, other than the Sarnia plant. The 23.4 MW Arnprior Solar Generating Station was built in 2009, and is expected to expand to 80 MW.
Additionally, a 68 megawatt solar farm can be found in Sault Ste. Marie, and a new 100 megawatt solar farm was built in Kingston, Ontario in 2015.

The most recent concentrated solar thermal power and storage technologies were barred from the FIT. The reason offered was that the technologies are not proven in Ontario climate.

The FIT program is intended for installations over 10 kW, while the microFIT program is to encourage the development of micro-scale renewable energy projects, such as residential solar photovoltaic (PV) installations. The microFIT program provides a rate of $0.802/kWh for rooftop mounted solar panels.
On July 2, 2010 the microFIT's program rate (for ground-mounted systems only) was lowered to $0.642/kWh by the Ontario Power Authority (OPA).
This new rate means consumers investing in solar energy through the Ontario microFIT Program will experience a drop in profit margin from a 25% range to 10%. On April 5, 2012 the rate was reduced to $0.549/kWh. The 2012 target is for 50 MW to be installed. As of August 7, 2012, 9,764 applications for the FIT have been submitted, totaling 8,504 MW. 1,757 applications have been submitted for the microFIT program, totaling 16 MW. Ontario plans to end coal generation by 2014.

Ontario is expected to reach 2,650 MW of solar PV by 2015.
As of December 2016, Ontario's solar energy installations have the capability of generating 1,947 MW.

Statistics

See also

Solar power by country
Feed-in tariff program in Canada
Green Energy Act 2009
Renewable energy in Canada
Wind power in Canada
Geothermal power in Canada
Hydroelectricity in Canada
List of renewable energy topics by country
Global Solar Atlas

References

External links 

 National Energy Board - Residential solar by province
 Solar irradiance maps